Rocky is a 1976 American sports drama film directed by John G. Avildsen and written by and starring Sylvester Stallone. It is the first installment in the Rocky franchise and also stars Talia Shire, Burt Young, Carl Weathers, and Burgess Meredith. In the film, Rocky Balboa (Stallone), a poor small-time club fighter and loanshark debt collector, gets an unlikely shot at the world heavyweight championship held by Apollo Creed (Weathers).

Rocky entered development in March 1975, after Stallone wrote the screenplay in three days. It entered a complicated production process after Stallone refused to allow the film to be made without him in the lead role; United Artists eventually agreed to cast Stallone after he rejected a six figure deal for the film rights. Principal photography began in January 1976, with filming primarily held in Philadelphia; several locations featured in the film, such as the Rocky Steps, are now considered cultural landmarks. With an estimated production budget of under $1 million, Rocky popularized the rags to riches and American Dream themes of sports dramas which preceded the film.

Rocky had its premiere in New York City on November 20, 1976, and was released in the United States on December 3, 1976. Rocky became the highest-grossing film of 1976, earning approximately $225 million worldwide. The film received critical acclaim toward Stallone's writing, performance, the story, as well as the film's direction, score, cinematography and editing; among other accolades, it received ten Academy Award nominations and won three, including Best Picture. It has been ranked by numerous publications as one of the greatest films of all time, as well as one of the most iconic sports films ever. 

Rocky and its theme song have become a pop-cultural phenomenon and an important part of 1970s American popular culture. In 2006, the Library of Congress selected Rocky for preservation in the United States National Film Registry for being "culturally, historically, or aesthetically significant". The first sequel in the series, Rocky II, was released in 1979.

Plot 

In 1975, the heavyweight boxing world champion, Apollo Creed, announces plans to hold a title bout in Philadelphia during the upcoming United States Bicentennial. However, he is informed five weeks from the fight date that his scheduled opponent Mac Lee Green is unable to compete due to an injured hand. With all other potential replacements booked up or otherwise unavailable, Creed decides to spice things up by giving a local contender a chance to challenge him.

Creed selects Rocky Balboa, an Italian American journeyman southpaw boxer who fights primarily in small gyms and works as a collector for a loan shark, on the basis of his nickname: The Italian Stallion. Rocky meets with promoter George Jergens assuming that Creed is seeking local sparring partners. Reluctant at first, Rocky eventually agrees to the fight which will pay him $150,000. Rocky undergoes several weeks of unorthodox training, such as using sides of beef as punching bags.

Rocky is later approached by Mickey Goldmill, a former bantamweight fighter turned trainer, whose gym Rocky frequents, about further training. Rocky is not willing initially, as Mickey has not shown much interest in helping him before and saw him as a wasted talent, but eventually Rocky accepts the offer.

Rocky begins to build a romantic relationship with Adrian Pennino, who is working part-time at the J&M Tropical Fish pet shop. Adrian's brother and Rocky's best friend, Paulie, helps Rocky get a date with his sister and offers to work as a corner man with him for the fight. Paulie becomes jealous of Rocky's success, but Rocky placates him by agreeing to advertise the meat packing business where Paulie works as part of the upcoming fight. The night before the fight, a sleepless Rocky visits the Philadelphia Spectrum and begins to lose confidence. He confesses to Adrian that he does not believe he can win, but strives to go the distance against Creed, which no other fighter has done, to prove himself to everyone.

On New Year's Day, the fight is held with Creed making a dramatic entrance dressed as George Washington and then Uncle Sam. Taking advantage of his overconfidence, Rocky knocks him down in the first round—the first time that Creed has ever been knocked down. Humbled and worried, Creed takes Rocky more seriously for the rest of the fight, though his ego never fully fades. The fight goes on for the full fifteen rounds, with both combatants sustaining various injuries. Rocky, with hits to the head and swollen eyes, requires his right eyelid to be cut to restore his vision. Apollo, with internal bleeding and a broken rib, struggles to breathe. As the fight concludes, Creed's superior skill is countered by Rocky's apparently unlimited ability to absorb punches and his dogged refusal to go down. As the final bell sounds, with both fighters embracing each other, they promise each other there will be no rematch.

After the fight, the sportscasters and the audience go wild. Jergens announces over the loudspeaker that the fight was "the greatest exhibition of guts and stamina in the history of the ring", and Rocky calls out repeatedly for Adrian, who runs down and Paulie distracts security to help her get into the ring. As Jergens declares Creed the winner by virtue of a split decision, Rocky and Adrian embrace and profess their love for each other, not caring about the outcome of the fight.

Cast 

 Sylvester Stallone as Robert "Rocky" Balboa
 Talia Shire as Adriana "Adrian" Pennino
 Burt Young as Paulie Pennino
 Carl Weathers as Apollo Creed
 Burgess Meredith as Michael "Mickey" Goldmill
 Thayer David as George "Miles" Jergens
 Joe Spinell as Tony Gazzo
 Tony Burton as Tony "Duke" Evers
 Pedro Lovell as Spider Rico
 Stan Shaw as "Big Dipper" Brown
 Joe Frazier as Himself

Production

Development and writing 
Sylvester Stallone wrote the screenplay for Rocky in three and a half days, shortly after watching the championship match between Muhammad Ali and Chuck Wepner that took place at Richfield Coliseum in Richfield, Ohio, on March 24, 1975. Wepner was TKO'd in the 15th round of the match by Ali, with few expecting him to last as long as he did. Despite the match motivating Stallone to begin work on Rocky, he has denied Wepner provided any inspiration for the script. Other inspiration for the film may have included characteristics of real-life boxers Rocky Marciano and Joe Frazier, as well as Rocky Graziano's autobiography Somebody Up There Likes Me and the movie of the same name. Wepner sued Stallone, and eventually settled for an undisclosed amount.

Henry Winkler, Stallone's co-star in The Lords of Flatbush who then broke out as Arthur Fonzarelli on ABC's Happy Days, said he had taken the script to executives at the network. They expressed interest in turning it into a made-for-television movie and actually bought the script but insisted that someone else re-write it. Upon hearing the news, Stallone begged Winkler not to let ABC change writers, so Winkler went back to the executives and offered to return the money in exchange for the rights. While ABC refused at first, Winkler said he was able to use his status as one of its biggest stars at the time to convince them to sell the rights back.

At the time, Film Artists Management Enterprises (FAME), a joint venture between Hollywood talent agents Craig T. Rumar and Larry Kubik, represented Stallone. He submitted his script to Rumar and Kubik, who immediately saw the potential for it to be made into a motion picture. They shopped the script to various producers and studios in Hollywood but were repeatedly rejected because Stallone insisted that he be cast in the lead role. Eventually, they secured a meeting with Winkler-Chartoff productions. After repeated negotiations with Rumar and Kubik, Winkler-Chartoff agreed to a contract for Stallone to be the writer and also star in the lead role for Rocky.

United Artists liked Stallone's script and viewed it as a vehicle for a well-established star like Robert Redford, Ryan O'Neal, Burt Reynolds, or James Caan. Stallone's agents insisted that Stallone portray the title character, to the point of issuing an ultimatum. Stallone later said that he would never have forgiven himself had the film become a success with somebody else in the lead. He also knew that producers Irwin Winkler and Robert Chartoff's contract with the studio enabled them to "greenlight" a project if the budget was kept low enough. The producers also collateralized any possible losses with their big-budget entry, New York, New York (whose eventual losses were covered by Rocky success). The film's production budget ended up being $1,075,000, with a further $100,000 spent on producers' fees and $4.2 million on advertising costs.

Pre-production 
Although Chartoff and Winkler were enthusiastic about the script and the idea of Stallone playing the lead character, they were hesitant about having an unknown headline the film. The producers also had trouble casting other major characters in the story, with Apollo Creed and Adrian cast unusually late by production standards. Real-life boxer Ken Norton was initially sought for the role of Apollo Creed, but he pulled out and the role was ultimately given to Carl Weathers. Norton, upon whom Creed was loosely based, fought Muhammad Ali three times. According to The Rocky Scrapbook, Carrie Snodgress was originally chosen to play Adrian, but a money dispute forced the producers to look elsewhere. Susan Sarandon auditioned for the role but was deemed too pretty for the character. After Talia Shire's ensuing audition, Chartoff and Winkler, and director John Avildsen, insisted that she play the part.

Philadelphia based boxer Joe Frazier has a cameo appearance in the film. Outspoken boxer Muhammad Ali, who fought Frazier three times, influenced the character of Apollo Creed. During the 49th Academy Awards ceremony in 1977, Ali and Stallone staged a brief comic confrontation to show the film did not offend Ali. Some of the plot's most memorable moments—Rocky's carcass-punching scenes and Rocky running up the steps of the Philadelphia Museum of Art as part of his training regimen—are taken from the real-life exploits of Joe Frazier, for which he received no credit.

Because of the film's comparatively low budget, members of Stallone's family played minor roles. His father rings the bell to signal the start and end of a round; his brother Frank plays a street corner singer, and his first wife, Sasha, was stills photographer. Other cameos include former Philadelphia and then Los Angeles television sportscaster Stu Nahan playing himself, alongside radio and TV broadcaster Bill Baldwin; and Lloyd Kaufman, founder of the independent film company Troma, appearing as a drunk. Diana Lewis, then a news anchor in Los Angeles and later in Detroit, has a minor scene as a TV news reporter. Tony Burton appears as Apollo Creed's trainer, Tony "Duke" Evers, a role he would reprise throughout the entire Rocky series, though the character is not named until Rocky II. Michael Dorn, who would later gain fame as the Klingon Worf in Star Trek: The Next Generation and Star Trek: Deep Space Nine, made his acting debut, albeit uncredited, as Creed's bodyguard.

Filming 
Principal photography for Rocky began on January 9, 1976. Filming took place primarily throughout Philadelphia, with a few scenes being shot in Los Angeles. Inventor Garrett Brown's new Steadicam was used to accomplish smooth photography while running alongside Rocky during the film's Philadelphia street training sequences and the run up the Art Museum's flight of stairs, now colloquially known as the Rocky Steps. It was also used for some shots in the fight scenes and can be seen at the ringside during some wide shots of the final fight. Rocky is often erroneously cited as the first film to use the Steadicam, although it was actually the third, after Bound for Glory and Marathon Man.

Certain elements of the story were altered during filming. The original script had a darker tone: Mickey was portrayed as racist, and the script ended with Rocky throwing the fight after realizing he did not want to be part of the professional boxing world after all.

Both Stallone and Weathers suffered injuries during the shooting of the final fight; Stallone suffered bruised ribs and Weathers suffered a damaged nose, the opposite injuries of what their characters had.

The first date between Rocky and Adrian, in which Rocky bribes a janitor to allow them to skate after closing hours on a deserted ice skating rink, was shot that way due to budgetary the scene was originally scheduled to be shot in a public skating rink during regular business hours, but the producers decided they could not afford the hundreds of extras that would have been required.

The poster seen above the ring before Rocky fights Apollo Creed shows Rocky wearing red shorts with a white stripe when he actually wears white shorts with a red stripe. When Rocky points this out, he is told that "it doesn't really matter, does it?" According to director Avildsen's DVD commentary, this was an actual mistake made by the props department that they could not afford to rectify, so Stallone wrote the brief scene to ensure the audience did not see it as a goof. Conversely, Stallone has said he was indeed supposed to wear red shorts with a white stripe as Rocky, but changed to the opposite colors "at the last moment". Similarly, when Rocky's robe arrived far too baggy on the day it was needed for filming, Stallone wrote in dialogue where Rocky points this out.

Music

Soundtrack 

Bill Conti composed the musical score for Rocky. He had composed a score for director John G. Avildsen's W.W. and the Dixie Dancekings (1975) that the studio ultimately rejected. David Shire (then-husband of Talia Shire) was the first to be offered the chance to compose the music for Rocky but had to turn it down because of prior commitments. Avildsen reached out to Conti without any studio help because of the film's relatively low budget. Avildsen said, "The budget for the music was 25 grand. And that was for everything: The composer's fee, that was to pay the musicians, that was to rent the studio, that was to buy the tape that it was going to be recorded on."

The main theme song, "Gonna Fly Now", made it to number one on Billboard magazine's Hot 100 list for one week (from July 2 to July 8, 1977) and the American Film Institute placed it 58th on its AFI's 100 Years...100 Songs. United Artists Records released the soundtrack album on November 12, 1976. EMI re-released the album on CD and cassette.

Frank Stallone's song "Take You Back" is also on the soundtrack, and he also sings the song in the movie with other friends around a trash can fire.

Release

Theatrical 
The movie began with two premieres in New York starting with the world premiere for Rocky which took place at Paramount Theatre in New York City on Saturday, November 20, 1976, by United Artists and one the day after on Sunday, November 21, 1976, by United Artists at Cinema II in New York City. The Los Angeles premiere took place at the Plaza in Westwood Village on December 1, 1976. This was then followed by a full official release on December 3, 1976 all throughout North America in the United States and Canada.

Home media 

 1980 UK video release by Intervision Betamax, VHS (Rental Only)
 1982 – CED Videodisc, Betamax and VHS; VHS release is rental only; 20th Century Fox Video release, Warner Home Video has rest of the World rights
 October 27, 1990 (VHS and LaserDisc)
 April 16, 1996 (VHS and LaserDisc)
 March 24, 1997 (DVD)
 April 24, 2001 (DVD, also packed with the Five-Disc Boxed Set)
 2001 (VHS, 25th anniversary edition)
 December 14, 2004 (DVD, also packed with the Rocky Anthology box set)
 February 8, 2005 (DVD, also packed with the Rocky Anthology box set)
 December 5, 2006 (DVD and Blu-ray Disc – 2-Disc Collector's Edition, the DVD was the first version released by Fox and was also packed with the Rocky Anthology box set and the Blu-ray was the first version released by 20th Century Fox Home Entertainment)
 December 4, 2007 (DVD box set – Rocky The Complete Saga. This new set contains the new Rocky Balboa, but does not include the recent 2 disc Rocky. There are still no special features for Rocky II through Rocky V, although Rocky Balboas DVD special features are all intact.)
 November 3, 2009  (Blu-ray box set – Rocky The Undisputed Collection. This release included six films in a box set. Previously, only the first film and Rocky Balboa were available on the format. Those two discs are identical to their individual releases, and the set also contains a disc of bonus material, new and old alike.)
May 6, 2014 - Blu-ray re-release with an all new 4K remaster and the previous special features of the old release.
 October 13, 2015 – Blu-ray box set, Rocky Heavyweight Collection 40th Anniversary Edition. All six films plus over three hours of bonus material, including the 4K remaster of the first film.

Reception

Box office 
Rocky grossed $5,488 on its opening day at Cinema II, a house record. When it was released nationally, it grossed $5 million during its first wide weekend and consistently performed well for eight months and eventually reached $117 million at the North American box office. Adjusted for inflation in 2018, the film earned over $500 million in North America alone. Overseas, Rocky grossed $107 million, for a worldwide box office total of $225 million. With its production budget of just under $1 million, Rocky is notable for its worldwide percentage return of over 11,000 percent. It was the highest-grossing film released in 1976 in the United States and Canada and the second highest-grossing film of 1977, behind Star Wars.

Critical response 
Rocky received positive reviews at the time of its release. Roger Ebert of the Chicago Sun-Times gave it 4 out of 4 stars and said that Stallone reminded him of "the young Marlon Brando." Box Office Magazine claimed audiences would be "touting Sylvester 'Sly' Stallone as a new star". Frank Rich liked the film, calling it "almost 100 per cent schmaltz", but favoring it over the cynicism that was prevalent in movies at that time, although he referred to the plot as "gimmicky" and the script "heavy-handed". Several reviews, including Richard Eder's (as well as Canby's negative review), compared the work to that of Frank Capra.

The film, however, did not escape criticism. Vincent Canby, of The New York Times, called it "pure '30s make believe" and dismissed both Stallone's acting and Avildsen's directing, calling the latter "none too decisive". Andrew Sarris found the Capra comparisons disingenuous: "Capra's movies projected more despair deep down than a movie like Rocky could envisage, and most previous ring movies have been much more cynical about the fight scene"; commenting on Rocky's work for a loan shark, Sarris says the film "teeters on the edge of sentimentalizing gangsters". He found Meredith "oddly cast in the kind of part the late James Gleason used to pick his teeth".

In modern times, the film enjoys a reputation as a classic and still receives nearly universal praise. On Rotten Tomatoes the film has an approval rating of 91% based on 70 reviews, with an average rating of 8.30/10. The site's critics consensus states: "This story of a down-on-his-luck boxer is thoroughly predictable, but Sylvester Stallone's script and stunning performance in the title role brush aside complaints." 

One of the positive online reviews came from the BBC Films website, with both reviewer Almar Haflidason and BBC online users giving it 5/5 stars. In Steven J. Schneider's 1001 Movies You Must See Before You Die, Schneider says the film is "often overlooked as schmaltz".

In 2006, the Library of Congress selected Rocky for preservation in the United States National Film Registry for being "culturally, historically, or aesthetically significant".

Accolades 

The Directors Guild of America awarded Rocky its annual award for best film of the year in 1976, and in 2006, Sylvester Stallone's original screenplay for Rocky was selected for the Writers Guild of America Award as the 78th best screenplay of all time.

In June 2008, AFI revealed its "Ten top Ten"—the best ten films in ten "classic" American film genres—after polling over 1,500 people from the creative community. Rocky was acknowledged as the second-best film in the sports genre, after Raging Bull.

In 2008, Rocky was chosen by British film magazine Empire as one of The 500 Greatest Movies of All Time. In contrast, in a 2005 poll by Empire, Rocky was No. 9 on their list of "The Top 10 Worst Pictures to Win Best Picture Oscar".

In 2015, The Hollywood Reporter polled hundreds of Academy members, asking them to re-vote on past controversial decisions. Academy members indicated that, given a second chance, they would award the 1977 Oscar for Best Picture to All the President's Men instead.

Year-end lists
Rocky has also appeared on several of the American Film Institute's 100 Years lists.
 AFI's 100 Years... 100 Movies (1998) – #78.
 AFI's 100 Years... 100 Thrills (2001) – #52
 AFI's 100 Years...100 Passions (2002) – Nominated
 AFI's 100 Years... 100 Heroes and Villains (2003)
 Rocky Balboa – #7 Hero.
 AFI's 100 Years...100 Songs (2004)
 "Gonna Fly Now" – #58
 AFI's 100 Years... 100 Movie Quotes (2005)
 "Yo, Adrian!" – #80.
 AFI's 100 Years of Film Scores (2005) – Nominated
 AFI's 100 Years... 100 Cheers (2006) – #4.
 AFI's 100 Years... 100 Movies (10th Anniversary Edition) (2007) – #57
 AFI's 10 Top 10 (2008) – #2 Sports Film

Other media

Sequels 

The film's success led to eight sequels, Beginning with Rocky II in 1979. Followed by Rocky III in 1982, Rocky IV in 1985, Rocky V in 1990, Rocky Balboa in 2006, Creed in 2015 and Creed II in 2018. Another sequel, titled Creed III, will be released in 2023; however, Stallone announced in April 2021 that he will not appear in the film.

Possible prequel 
In July 2019, Stallone said in an interview that there have been ongoing discussions about a prequel to the original film based on the life of a young Rocky Balboa.

Rocky Steps 

The famous scene of Rocky running up the steps of the Philadelphia Museum of Art has become a cultural icon, with the steps acquiring the vernacular title of "Rocky Steps". In 1982, a statue of Rocky, commissioned by Stallone for Rocky III, was placed at the top of the Rocky Steps. City Commerce Director Dick Doran claimed that Stallone and Rocky had done more for the city's image than "anyone since Ben Franklin".

Differing opinions of the statue and its placement led to a relocation to the sidewalk outside the Spectrum Arena, although the statue was temporarily returned to the top of the steps in 1990 for Rocky V, and again in 2006 for the 30th anniversary of the original Rocky (although this time it was placed at the bottom of the steps). Later that year, it was moved permanently to a spot next to the steps.

The scene is frequently parodied in the media. In the 2008 movie You Don't Mess with the Zohan, Zohan's nemesis, Phantom, goes through a parody training sequence finishing with him running up a desert dune and raising his hands in victory. In the fourth-season finale of The Fresh Prince of Bel-Air, as the credits roll at the end of the episode, Will is seen running up the steps at the Philadelphia Museum of Art; however, as he celebrates after finishing his climb, he passes out in exhaustion, and while he lies unconscious on the ground, a pickpocket steals his wallet and his wool hat. In The Nutty Professor, there is a scene where Sherman Klump (Eddie Murphy) struggles to, and eventually succeeds at, running up a lengthy flight of steps on his college campus, victoriously throwing punches at the top.

In 2006, E! named the "Rocky Steps" scene number 13 on its 101 Most Awesome Moments in Entertainment list.

During the 1996 Summer Olympics torch relay, Philadelphia native Dawn Staley was chosen to run up the museum steps. In 2004, Presidential candidate John Kerry ended his pre-convention campaign at the foot of the steps before going to Boston to accept his party's nomination for president.

Novelization 
Upon the film's release, a paperback novelization of the screenplay written by Rosalyn Drexler under the pseudonym Julia Sorel and published by Ballantine Books was released.

Video games 

Several video games have been produced based on the film. Rocky was released in 1987 for the Master System. Rocky was released in 2002 for the GameCube, Game Boy Advance, PlayStation 2, and Xbox, and a sequel, Rocky Legends, was released in 2004 for the PlayStation 2 and Xbox. In 2016, Tapinator released a mobile game named ROCKY for the iOS platform, with a planned 2017 release for Google Play and Amazon platforms.

Musical 

A musical was written by Stephen Flaherty and Lynn Ahrens (lyrics and music), with the book by Thomas Meehan, based on the film. The musical premiered in Hamburg, Germany in October 2012. It began performances at the Winter Garden Theater on Broadway on February 11, 2014, and officially opened on March 13, 2014.

Documentaries 
The 2016 film Chuck depicts Chuck Wepner and his 1975 title fight with the heavyweight champion, Muhammad Ali, and the fight's influence on the screenplay for Rocky.

Rocky is featured in the 2017 documentary John G. Avildsen: King of the Underdogs about Academy Award-winning Rocky director John G. Avildsen, directed and produced by Derek Wayne Johnson.

Stallone later hand-picked Johnson to direct and produce a documentary on the making of the original Rocky, entitled 40 Years of Rocky: The Birth of a Classic, which was released in 2020. The documentary features Stallone narrating behind-the-scenes footage from the making of the film.

National Museum of American History 
The red satin robe and black hat worn by Stallone in Rocky (1976) are featured in the National Museum of American History. Likewise, the red gloves worn by Stallone in Rocky II (1979), his white Nike boxing shoes, and striped boxing trunks from Rocky III (1981) are archived at the Museum. All items were on display for a temporary period following Stallone's donation in 2006, and have since been moved to the museum archives.

References

External links 

 
 
 
 
 

 The Making of Rocky by Sylvester Stallone
 A Movie of Blood, Spit and Tears by Royce Webb
 Six Little Known Truths about Rocky by Ralph Wiley
 Which Rocky is the real champ? by Bill Simmons
 Rocky: Behind the Scenes

1970s sports drama films
1970s American films
1976 films
American boxing films
American sports drama films
Best Drama Picture Golden Globe winners
Best Picture Academy Award winners
1970s English-language films
Films directed by John G. Avildsen
Films produced by Irwin Winkler
Films produced by Robert Chartoff
Films scored by Bill Conti
Films set in 1975
Films set in 1976
Films set in Pennsylvania
Films set in Philadelphia
Films shot in Philadelphia
Films whose director won the Best Directing Academy Award
Films whose editor won the Best Film Editing Academy Award
Rocky (film series) films
Films with screenplays by Sylvester Stallone
United Artists films
United States National Film Registry films
Films about Italian-American culture
1976 drama films
Works subject to a lawsuit